Charles Lawther is a British-born Canadian actor, comedian and writer.

Lawther came to local prominence in Toronto when in the 1980s he created the character of Chuck The Security Guard for CFMT-TV's The All-Night Show, on the ostensible premise that as the station's night security he would be allowed to use the broadcast facilities to play classic television shows, short films and music videos between sign-off and 6 a.m.

Lawther and his comedy partner Suzette Couture formed the comedy duo Joined at the Hip, regularly playing comedy venues across Canada and at one point getting their own special on CBC. Lawther has written and hosted several comedy "stand-up mockumentaries" on CBC Radio.

He also wrote episodes for television shows including Bob and Margaret, The Raccoons and The All-Night Show and the direct to video film The Sex and Violence Family Hour. He also created a television movie documentary film called Is It Arf? in which he hosted and starred with his wife Gail Kerbel.

Many know him for his role hosting "The Showcase Revue" after the Showcase channel launched in Canada in the early 1990s.

Lawther is still a working actor, and was a recurring character as a seemingly gormless television executive on CBC's Made in Canada.

Filmography

1966: Blowup - Waiter (uncredited)
1979: Matt and Jenny - Friar
1980-1981: The All-Night Show (CFMT-TV, TV series host) - Chuck the Security Guard
1982: Chuck's Choice Cuts  (straight to video special produced for Admit One Video) - Chuck the Security Guard
1983: The Littlest Hobo - Drugue / Proust / Mr. Proust / Murphy
1985: Terminal Choice - Kingsley's Son-in-law
1986: Mafia Princess - Make-up Artist
1986: Police Academy 3: Back in Training - Mr. Delaney
1987: Ford: The Man and the Machine - Connors
1988: Friday the 13th: The Series - Phil / Bernie Bell
1989: Champagne Charlie (TV movie) - David McLeod
1989: George's Island - Blinky
1990: Dracula: The Series - Lane Zorro
1991: Street Legal - Ed Hollis
1992: The Shower - Wayne
1993: Shining Time Station - Ringmaster
1993: E.N.G. - Philpott
1994: The Ref - Santa Family #2
1994: Paint Cans - Wick Burns
1994: The Mighty Jungle - Brill
1995: Almost Golden: The Jessica Savitch Story (TV movie) - Arnie
1995: Iron Eagle IV - Col. Birkett
1995: Kung Fu: The Legend Continues
1996: F/X: The Series - Konich
1997: Lexx: The Dark Zone Stories (TV series regular) - Video Customs Officer
1997: Good Will Hunting - M.I.T. Professor
1998: Elimination Dance
1998: Made in Canada - Brian
1998: La Femme Nikita - Gufeld
1999: Power Play - Harrison Boulder
1999: Love Letters (TV movie) - Harry
2000: Urban Legends: Final Cut - Dean Patterson
2000: The Secret Adventures of Jules Verne - Dr. Cordoba
2002: Puppets Who Kill - Dr. Lester / Chester the Great
2003: Slings and Arrows - Mr. Stewart
2004: Zixx: Level One
2004: Wonderfalls - Pastor
2004: This is Wonderland
2007: Is It Art? (CBC Television) - Himself - Host
2007: Full of It - Mr. Von Der Ahe
2008: The Border - Bennett Barden
2009: Little Mosque on the Prairie - Rivertree's Father

In development: Things That Intimidate Me (TVOntario)

References

External links
 Northern Stars: Chas Lawther
 
 
 Foolish Earthling Productions: 10,000 Shiftless Nights production information All-Night Show reunion programme.
Chas Lawther at TV Guide

Living people
Year of birth missing (living people)
British emigrants to Canada
Canadian television writers
Canadian male screenwriters
Canadian male television writers
Canadian male television actors
Canadian male film actors
Canadian male voice actors
Male actors from Toronto
Writers from Toronto
20th-century Canadian screenwriters
20th-century Canadian male writers
21st-century Canadian screenwriters
21st-century Canadian male writers